Petrosimonia is a genus of flowering plants belonging to the family Amaranthaceae. It is also in the Salsoloideae tribe.

It is native to Albania, Bulgaria, Greece, Romania  (in southeastern Europe), Central European Russia, Crimea South European Russia and Ukraine, (Eastern Europe), Altay, Irkutsk, Tuva and West Siberia, (in Siberia), North Caucasus, Transcaucasus, (in the Caucasus),

Kazakhstan, Kyrgyzstan, Tajikistan, Turkmenistan and Uzbekistan (in Central Asia) and Afghanistan, Iran, Lebanon, Mongolia, Syria and Turkey, (in Western Asia) and also Xinjiang in China.

The genus name of Petrosimonia is in honour of Peter Simon Pallas (1741–1811), a Prussian zoologist and botanist who worked in Russia (1767–1810). 
It was first described and published in Mém. Acad. Imp. Sci. Saint Pétersbourg, Sér. 7, Vol.4 (Issue 11) on page 52 in 1862.

Known species
According to Kew:
Petrosimonia brachiata 
Petrosimonia brachyphylla 
Petrosimonia glauca 
Petrosimonia glaucescens 
Petrosimonia hirsutissima 
Petrosimonia litwinowii 
Petrosimonia monandra 
Petrosimonia oppositifolia 
Petrosimonia sibirica 
Petrosimonia squarrosa 
Petrosimonia triandra

References

Amaranthaceae
Amaranthaceae genera
Plants described in 1862
Taxa named by Alexander von Bunge